Annaville is a neighborhood in Corpus Christi, Texas. It was a town established by Leo and Anna Stewart in 1940, before being annexed by Corpus Christi in the mid-1960s. Annaville borders the Calallen district of Corpus Christi.

Education 
Tuloso-Midway Independent School District
 Tuloso-Midway High School

References

External links
The Handbook of Texas Online

Geography of Corpus Christi, Texas